Bagabag, officially the Municipality of Bagabag,  is a 2nd class municipality in the province of Nueva Vizcaya, Philippines. According to the 2020 census, it has a population of 37,985 people.

Bagabag is famous for its buko pie (coconut pie) in the Cagayan Valley region and it is the gateway to the world-famous Banaue Rice Terraces. It is considered the pineapple region of Nueva Vizcaya. The main crops produced are rice, corn, coconut, mango, and pineapple. Bagabag has the largest tilapia farming in the region. Main resources include agriculture, livestock, and fruit-bearing trees plantation. Main industries include furniture, hollow block factory, tilapia farming, buko pie, pineapple vinegar, and meat processing. Located in the northern part of the town is Bagabag Airport, the only airport of Nueva Vizcaya, which serves the province and its surrounding area.

History

The natives of Bagabag are the Gaddangs whose ancestors originally came from Cagayan and Isabela provinces. At the coming of the Spaniards, the natives were mostly settled along the Magat River where they had small farms of vegetables and rootcrops. They had also ricefields. Most of them, however, depended on fishing and hunting for their livelihood. The Spaniards found the Igorots along the Lanog and Lamut Rivers and in the hills, east of the Magat River, they found the Bugkalots.

The town was formed on October 7, 1741, during the Spanish regime by a Dominican friar, Padre (Pe.) Antonio del Campo, at sitio "Nagcumventuan" a place now located between Pogonsino, Bagabag, Nueva Vizcaya and Bangar, Solano, Nueva Vizcaya. The present name of the sitio bears proof to the fact that the Spanish priest constructed a church in the original town site.

Pe. Luis Sierra and Pe. Alejandro were among the first priests to settle in 1743. They organized the town in 1754. Due to the continuous erosion and flood from the Magat River and its increasing population, Pe. Vidal later transferred the town site to "Nassa" which is located between Barangays Lantap and Santa Lucia. The "Nassa" location was open and muddy throughout the year. Thus for the third time, Pe. Vidal transferred the town site to its present site where numerous buri palms were then growing. It was from this buri palm plant the name of Bagabag originated, the same being called by the natives as "bagbag". No account could be given on the exact date of the year the present town of Bagabag was founded as the records were destroyed during World War II.

In 1945, the combined United States and the Philippine Commonwealth troops together with the town's guerrillas attacked the Japanese Imperial forces in the Battle of Bagabag during World War II.

Geography
The Magat River, which runs parallel to the Pan-Philippine Highway (AH 26), is situated in the eastern part of the town proper.

Barangays 
Bagabag is politically subdivided into 17 barangays. These barangays are headed by elected officials: Barangay Captain, Barangay Council, whose members are called Barangay Councilors. All are elected every three years.

Bordering Areas 
 Lamut, Ifugao (north)
 Diadi (east)
 Villaverde (west)
 Quezon (south)
 Solano (southwest)

Climate

Demographics

The natives of Bagabag are the Ga'dangs or Gaddangs whose ancestors originally came from the Cagayan and Isabela regions. The Gaddangs predominantly live in the town proper and they speak the Gaddang language. Many Ilocanos and Tagalogs have migrated and live in Bagabag.

Economy

Tilapia Industry
On January 11, 2008, the Cagayan Bureau of Fisheries and Aquatic Resources (BFAR) stated that tilapia fish production grew and Cagayan Valley is now the Philippines' tilapia capital. Production supply grew 37.25% since 2003, with 14,000 metric tons (MT) in 2007. The recent aquaculture congress found that the growth of tilapia production was due to government interventions: provision of fast-growing species, accreditation of private hatcheries to ensure supply of quality fingerlings, establishment of demonstration farms, providing free fingerlings to newly constructed fishponds, and the dissemination of tilapia to Nueva Vizcaya (in Diadi town). Former cycling champion Lupo Alava is a multi-awarded tilapia raiser in Bagabag. Chairman Thompson Lantion of the Land Transportation Franchising and Regulatory Board, a retired two-star police general, has fishponds in La Torre, Bayombong. Also, Nueva Vizcaya Governor Luisa Lloren Cuaresma also entered into similar aquaculture endeavors in addition to tilapia production.

Government

Bagabag, belonging to the lone congressional district of the province of Nueva Vizcaya, is governed by a mayor designated as its local chief executive and by a municipal council as its legislative body in accordance with the Local Government Code. The mayor, vice mayor, and the councilors are elected directly by the people through an election which is being held every three years.

Elected officials

Education
The Schools Division of Nueva Vizcaya governs the town's public education system. The division office is a field office of the DepEd in Cagayan Valley region. The office governs the public and private elementary and public and private high schools throughout the municipality.

References

External links

Local Government Unit of Bagabag
[ Philippine Standard Geographic Code]
Philippine Census Information
Local Governance Performance Management System

Municipalities of Nueva Vizcaya